Pucusana is a town in Central Peru, capital of the district Pucusana in the province Lima.

External links
  www.pucusanaperu.com

This small fishing town is located about an hour's drive south from Lima.  Its coastal location makes it home to several unique species of birds, dolphins, and other marine animals.

Populated places in the Lima Region